The Hilbre One Design is a British trailerable sailboat that was designed by Alan Buchanan as a one design racer, specifically for the West Kirby Sailing Club in northwest England and first built in 1958.

Production
The design has been built in the United Kingdom since 1958, with 55 boats completed.

Design
The Hilbre One Design is a racing keelboat, built predominantly of wood with clinker construction. It has a fractional sloop rig, a spooned raked stem, a plumb transom, a transom-hung rudder controlled by a tiller and a fixed stub keel with a retractable centreboard. It displaces  and carries  of iron ballast.

For downwind sailing the design is equipped with a spinnaker.

See also
List of sailing boat types

References

External links
 archives on archive.org
Photo of a Hilbre One Design

Keelboats
1950s sailboat type designs
Sailing yachts
Trailer sailers
Sailboat type designs by Alan Buchanan
Sailboat types built in the United Kingdom
One-design sailing classes